Northumberland County, Quebec is a local division within Quebec and also formerly in Lower Canada.

References 

Lower Canada